The Union of Clubs for the Renewal of the Left (UCRG) was a socialist club in France led by Alain Savary.

The UCRG included clubs led by Alain Savary and Pierre Bérégovoy. The UCRG joined the Federation of the Democratic and Socialist Left before merging into the new PS at the Alfortville Congress.

1966 establishments in France
Political parties disestablished in 1969
Political parties established in 1966
Political parties of the French Fifth Republic
Socialist parties in France
Socialist Party (France)